What's with Andy? is an animated series that aired from 2001 to 2007. The series was produced by CinéGroupe, and aired on Teletoon. It was based on the Just! series of books written by Andy Griffiths and illustrated by Terry Denton.

The seasons 1 and 2 episode order below follows that of the DVD releases in Europe, which also closely matches the original airdates on Teletoon in Canada.

Series overview

Episodes

Season 1 (2001–2002)

Season 2 (2003–2004)

Season 3 (2006–2007)

References 

Lists of American children's animated television series episodes
Lists of Canadian children's animated television series episodes
Lists of French animated television series episodes